Ras Bar Balla() is a historic town in the southern Lower Juba region of Somalia.

Overview
An ancient area of occupation, Ras Bar Balla is situated on a small promontory. The settlement contains two tombs: one decorated with rectangular panels, the other plain in design. Today, it is mainly used as a resting place for Somali herders and their flock. It is believed to date back to the powerful Ajuran Empire.

See also
Damo
Essina
Gondershe
Hannassa
Malao
Mosylon
Opone
Ras Hafun
Sarapion
Somali maritime history

References

Archaeological sites in Somalia
Former populated places in Somalia
Ajuran Sultanate
Archaeological sites of Eastern Africa